Southeastway Park is a 188-acre nature park managed by the Indianapolis Parks and Recreation Department. The park is located in the southeast corner of Marion County at 5624 South Carroll Road.

Park facilities and buildings 

 Paved walking/biking trail (~2.5 miles)
 Sledding hill
 Playground
 Shelters (6) 
 Picnic sites (3)
 Education center

Seasonal park activities 

 Mid-February-Mid-March: Maple Syrup Making

 Last Sunday in August: Bug Fest
 June-July: Summer Camps
 Late September-Early November: Hayride Season

Natural areas
There are a variety of natural habitats on the property including:

 80 acres of forest
 A pond and wetland 
 Open fields and meadows
 A Prairie preserve
 Buck Creek

See also
List of parks in Indianapolis

References

External links 
 

Urban public parks
Parks in Indianapolis